Zikai may refer to:

Qidiao Kai or Zikai (子開; born 540 BC), disciple of Confucius
Feng Zikai (豐子愷; 1898–1975), pioneering manhua artist
Zikai (singer) (born 1997), Swedish singer-songwriter